Kabir Kohli (born 4 March 2000) is an Indian footballer who plays as a goalkeeper for Sudeva Delhi. Besides India, he has played in Spain.

Career

In 2019, Kohli signed for Spanish fourth tier side Olímpic de Xàtiva from Sudeva Moonlight. In 2020, he signed for CD Llosa of Regional Preferente de la Comunidad Valenciana. In 2021, he signed for Indian club Sudeva Delhi after trialing for the reserves of FC Bayern in the German Bundesliga. On 25 April 2022, Kohli debuted for Sudeva Delhi during a 1–0 win over TRAU.

See also
 List of Indian football players in foreign leagues

References

External links
 

2000 births
Association football goalkeepers
CD Olímpic de Xàtiva footballers
Expatriate footballers in Spain
I-League players
Indian expatriate footballers
Indian footballers
Sudeva Delhi FC players
Tercera División players
Living people